Redouane is an Arabic masculine given name. Notable people with the name include:
Hajry Redouane (born 1964), retired Moroccan footballer who played as an attacking midfielder, and a manager
Redouane Akniouene (born 1982), Algerian footballer
Redouane Barkaoui (born 1979), Moroccan footballer
Redouane Bouchtouk (born 1976), Moroccan boxer
Wassila Redouane Saïd-Guerni (born 1980), Algerian foil fencer

See also
 Ridvan

Arabic masculine given names